Vallonjärvi  is a lake in Valkeakoski, Finland, and it belongs to the Kokemäenjoki water system, which is one of the largest water systems in Finland.

Geography 
The lake is located on the southwest side of Valkeakoski town. The River Vallonjoki flows through the northern end of the lake to Yrjölänlahti Bay, which is part of the much larger Vanajavesi lake. The forests on the east side of the lake belong to Heikkilänmetsä nature reserve, where there is a bird observation tower on the shoreline. As a wetland, Vallonjärvi is biologically diverse of all ecosystems, serving as home to a wide range of plant and animal life.

References 

Lakes of Valkeakoski